Bandy Federation of Mongolia is the governing body for bandy in Mongolia. Its headquarters is in Bayangol district. Bandy Federation of Mongolia became a member of Federation of International Bandy in 2002.

National team

References

Mongolia
Sports governing bodies in Mongolia
Federation of International Bandy members
Bandy in Mongolia